Alain Blondel (born 7 December 1962 in Petit-Quevilly, Seine-Maritime) is a retired French decathlete. During his career he won the European title once.

Achievements

External links

1962 births
Living people
French decathletes
Athletes (track and field) at the 1988 Summer Olympics
Athletes (track and field) at the 1992 Summer Olympics
Olympic athletes of France
People from Le Petit-Quevilly
European Athletics Championships medalists
Sportspeople from Seine-Maritime